Phyllonorycter ololua is a moth of the family Gracillariidae. It is found in Kenya in dry highland forest at about 1,500 meters with stands of very high trees.

The length of the forewings is 3.23 mm. The forewings are golden ochreous with white markings. The hindwings are pale beige with a pale grey fringe. Adults are on wing in late May.

Etymology
The species’ name refers to the name of its type locality.

References

Endemic moths of Kenya
Moths described in 2012
ololua
Moths of Africa

Taxa named by Jurate de Prins